Frederick Wallingford Whitridge (August 8, 1852 – December 30, 1916) was President of the Third Avenue Railway Company.

Biography
He was born on August 8, 1852 in New Bedford, Massachusetts to John C. Whitridge. He married the daughter of Matthew Arnold. He died on December 30, 1916, three days after his appendix operation.

In 1919, Whitridge’s daughter Eleanor Lucia married Lt. Col. Norman Thwaites, Director of the British Mission, New York. and they had two sons and two daughters.

References

1852 births
1916 deaths
People from New Bedford, Massachusetts